Malvi or Malwi (माळवी भाषा), is an Indo-Aryan language spoken in the Malwa region of India. It is closely related to Nimadi, which is spoken in the Nimar region of Madhya Pradesh.

The dialects of Malvi are Ujjaini (Ujjain, 
Dhar, Indore, Dewas, Shajapur, Sehore districts), Rajawadi (Ratlam, Mandsaur, Neemuch districts), Umathwadi (Rajgarh district), and Sondhwadi (Jhalawar district). Ujjaini is the prestige dialect, and the language as a whole sometimes goes by that name.mixed dialect of Malvi bhoyari speak in betul and chhindwada district.

About 75% of the Malvi population can converse in Hindi, which is the official language of the Madhya Pradesh state, and literacy rate in a second language such as Hindi is about 40%. There are many unpublished materials in this language.

See also
Rangri dialect (Malvi)

References

Hindi languages
Languages of India
Culture of Malwa